Chevra Kaddisha Cemetery (English: Holy Society), later known as Home of Peace Cemetery, was the first Jewish cemetery in California founded on November 12, 1850 by the Sacramento City Hebrew Association, and was once located at 33rd at K Streets (present-day 3230 J Street) in the East Sacramento neighborhood of Sacramento, California. The cemetery closed around 1924, and is no longer standing. It is the location of a strip mall, there is no historical plaque. 

The site is listed as a California Historical Landmark (number 654-1), by the California Office of Historic Preservation since July 28, 1958.

History 
Moses Hyman, a merchant from New Orleans that settled in Sacramento in 1849, had donated to the Jewish Benevolent Society for the establishment of the cemetery. Hyman had made the journey from New Orleans to California with Samuel Harris Goldstein, a merchant who settled in Marysville and accidentally died on May 30, 1850 when he fell overboard on a boat. It is believed that Goldstein was the first person buried at the cemetery. The cemetery was owned by Congregation B'nai Israel of Sacramento. Some 500 burials occurred at this site. It was located across the street to the former New Helvetia Cemetery, the first cemetery in the city.  

In 1924, part of the cemetery land was sold, and they started reinterring graves. The majority were moved to Home of Peace Jewish Cemetery (at 6200 Stockton Blvd.) in Sacramento, as well as some were moved to the Jewish cemeteries in Colma, California. The last portion of the cemetery land was sold in 1945.

See also 
 California Historical Landmarks in Sacramento County
 Chevra kadisha, a Jewish 19th-century burial association
 List of cemeteries in California
 Sacramento Historic City Cemetery
 Sonora Hebrew Cemetery, first Jewish cemetery in the Gold Rush area

References 

Jewish cemeteries in California
Cemeteries in Sacramento County, California
History of Sacramento, California
California Historical Landmarks
1850 establishments in California
1924 disestablishments in California